"Llévame Contigo" ("Take Me with You") is a bachata song by American singer Romeo Santos from his debut studio album Formula, Vol. 1 (2011). A live version of the song was released as a single from The King Stays King: Sold Out at Madison Square Garden (2012).

Charts

Certifications

See also
List of Billboard number-one Latin songs of 2013

References

2011 songs
2012 singles
Romeo Santos songs
Songs written by Romeo Santos
Sony Music Latin singles
Live singles